Iheagu, Nru Nsukka is the oldest sub communities in Nru Nsukka. It's the birthplace of people like Sen. Fidelis Okoro, Egbugo Charles Onumonu and Sylvanus Arumah (Eze udo 1 of former Nru Nsukka Autonomous Community). Nru Nsukka has traditionally three major communities namely Iheagu,Nru Nsukka, Enugu State, Ezema Nru, Edem Nru and finally Umuoyo. Sen. Okoro hails from Iheagu, Nru Nsukka.

Populated places in Enugu State